Christianity and Druze are Abrahamic religions that share a historical traditional connection with some major theological differences. The two faiths share a common place of origin in the Middle East, and are monotheistic.

Christianity is an Abrahamic monotheistic religion based on the life and teachings of Jesus of Nazareth. Its adherents, known as Christians, believe that Jesus is the Christ, whose coming as the Messiah was prophesied in the Old Testament, and chronicled in the New Testament. The primary scripture of Christianity is the Bible. It is the world's largest religion with about 2.4 billion followers.

Jethro of Midian is considered an ancestor of Druze, who revere him as their spiritual founder and chief prophet. Druzism it is a monotheistic and Abrahamic religion based on the teachings of Hamza ibn-'Ali ibn-Ahmad and the sixth Fatimid caliph Al-Hakim bi-Amr Allah, and Greek philosophers such as Plato, Aristotle, Pythagoras, and Zeno of Citium. The Epistles of Wisdom (Rasa'il al-Hikmah) is the foundational text of the Druze faith. Even though the faith originally developed out of Ismaili Islam, Druze do not identify as Muslim and no longer consider themselves Muslim.
The number of Druze people worldwide is between 800,000 and one million, with the vast majority residing in the Levant.

Historically the relationship between the Druze and Christians has been characterized by harmony and peaceful coexistence, with amicable relations between the two groups prevailing throughout history, with the exception of some periods, including 1860 Mount Lebanon civil war. Conversion of Druze to Christianity used to be common practice in the Levant region. Over the centuries, a number of the Druze embraced Christianity, such as some of Shihab dynasty members, as well as the Abi-Lamma clan.

The Maronite Catholics and the Druze set the foundation for what is now Lebanon in the early 18th century, through a governing and social system known as the "Maronite-Druze dualism" in Mount Lebanon Mutasarrifate. Contact between Christians (members of the Maronite, Eastern Orthodox, Melkite, and other churches) and the Druze led to the presence of mixed villages and towns in Mount Lebanon, Chouf, Jabal al-Druze, the Galilee region, Mount Carmel, and Golan Heights.

Druze doctrine teaches that Christianity is to be "esteemed and praised" as the Gospel writers are regarded as "carriers of wisdom". The Druze faith incorporates some elements of Christianity, in addition to adoption of Christian elements on the Epistles of Wisdom. Both religions revere Jesus, John the Baptist, Saint George, Elijah, Luke the Evangelist, Job and other common figures. Figures in the Old Testament such as Adam, Noah, Abraham, Moses, and Jethro are considered important prophets of God in the Druze faith, being among the seven prophets who appeared in different periods of history.

Religious comparison 
In terms of religious comparison, mainstream Christian denominations do not believe in reincarnation or the transmigration of the soul, contrary to the beliefs of the Druze; on the other hand, reincarnation is a paramount tenet in the Druze faith. Christianity teaches evangelism, often through the establishment of missions, unlike the Druze who do not accept converts to their faith. Marriage outside the Druze faith is rare and is strongly discouraged. Similarities between the Druze and Christians include commonalities in their view of monogamous marriage, as well as the forbidding of divorce and remarriage, in addition to the belief in the oneness of God and theophany. The Druze faith incorporates some elements of Christianity, and other religious beliefs.

Christianity does not require male circumcision, with covenant theology teaching that the Christian sacrament of baptism fulfills the Israelite practice of circumcision, both being signs and seals of the covenant of grace. Most mainstream Christian denominations currently maintain a neutral position on the practice of non-religious circumcision. Male circumcision is commonly practiced in many predominantly Christian countries and many Christian communities, and in the Coptic Orthodox Church, the Ethiopian Orthodox Church and the Eritrean Orthodox Tewahedo Church it is seen as a rite of passage. While male Circumcision is widely practiced by the Druze, ​the procedure is practiced as a cultural tradition, and has no religious significance in the Druze faith. Some Druzes do not circumcise their male children, and refuse to observe this practice.

Druze doctrine teaches that Christianity is to be "esteemed and praised" as the Gospel writers are regarded as "carriers of wisdom". Both religions revere Jesus, John the Baptist, Saint George, Elijah, Luke the Evangelist, Job and other common figures. The Druze faith shows influence of Christian monasticism, among other religious practices. 

Figures in the Old Testament such as Adam, Noah, Abraham, and Moses are considered important prophets of God in the Druze faith, being among the seven prophets who appeared in different periods of history. In the Old Testament, Jethro was Moses' father-in-law, a Kenite shepherd and priest of Midian. Shuaib or Jethro of Midian is considered an ancestor of the Druze who revere him as their spiritual founder and chief prophet.

Perspectives on Jesus 

Both faiths give a prominent place to Jesus: Jesus is the central figure of Christianity, and in the Druze faith, Jesus is considered an important prophet of God, being among the seven prophets who appeared in different periods of history.

Christian 

Jesus is the central figure of Christianity. Although Christian views of Jesus vary, it is possible to summarize the key beliefs shared among major denominations, as stated in their catechetical or confessional texts. Christian views of Jesus are derived from various sources, including the canonical gospels and New Testament letters such as the Pauline epistles and the Johannine writings. These documents outline the key beliefs held by Christians about Jesus, including his divinity, humanity, and earthly life, and that he is the Christ and the Son of God. Despite their many shared beliefs, not all Christian denominations agree on all doctrines, and both major and minor differences on teachings and beliefs have persisted throughout Christianity for centuries.

Christian doctrines include the beliefs that Jesus was conceived by the Holy Spirit, was born of a virgin named Mary, performed miracles, founded the Christian Church, died by crucifixion as a sacrifice to achieve atonement for sin, rose from the dead, and ascended into Heaven, from where he will return. Commonly, Christians believe Jesus enables people to be reconciled to God. The Nicene Creed asserts that Jesus will judge the living and the dead either before or after their bodily resurrection, an event tied to the Second Coming of Jesus in Christian eschatology. The great majority of Christians worship Jesus as the incarnation of God the Son, the second of three persons of the Trinity. A small minority of Christian denominations reject Trinitarianism, wholly or partly, as non-scriptural.

Druze Faith 

The Druze venerate Jesus "the son of Joseph and Mary" and his four disciples, who wrote the Gospels. According to the Druze manuscripts Jesus is the Greatest Imam and the incarnation of Ultimate Reason (Akl) on earth and the first cosmic principle (Hadd), and regards Jesus and Hamza ibn Ali as the incarnations of one of the five great celestial powers, who form part of their system. Druze doctrines include the beliefs that Jesus was born of a virgin named Mary, performed miracles, and died by crucifixion. Druze doctrines include that Hamza ibn Ali took Jesus down from the cross and allowed him to return to his family, in order to prepare men for the preaching of his religion. In the Druze tradition, Jesus is known under three titles: the True Messiah (al-Masih al-Haq), the Messiah of all Nations (Masih al-Umam), and the Messiah of Sinners. This is due, respectively, to the belief that Jesus delivered the true Gospel message, the belief that he was the Saviour of all nations, and the belief that he offers forgiveness.

Druze believe that Hamza ibn Ali was a reincarnation of Jesus, and that Hamza ibn Ali is the true Messiah, who directed the deeds of the Messiah Jesus "the son of Joseph and Mary", but when Jesus "the son of Joseph and Mary" strayed from the path of the true Messiah, Hamza filled the hearts of the Jews with hatred for him – and for that reason, they crucified him, according to the Druze manuscripts. Despite this, Hamza ibn Ali took him down from the cross and allowed him to return to his family, in order to prepare men for the preaching of his religion. In an epistle ascribed to one of the founders of Druzism, Baha al-Din al-Muqtana, probably written sometime between AD 1027 and AD 1042, accused the Jews of crucifying Jesus.

Perspectives on Elijah, John the Baptist, and Saint George 
Both religions revere John the Baptist, Saint George, and Elijah. Druze, believe that Elijah came back as John the Baptist, or as Saint George, since they belief in reincarnation and the transmigration of the soul, Druze believe that El Khidr and John the Baptist and Saint George are one and the same.

Druze Faith 

Druze tradition honors several "mentors" and "prophets", and Elijah (Khidr) is honored as a prophet. Druze venerate Elijah, and he is considered a central figure in Druzism. And due to his importance in Druzism, the settlement of Druze on Mount Carmel had partly to do with Elijah's story and devotion. There are two large Druze towns on the eastern slopes of Mount Carmel: Daliyat al-Karmel and Isfiya. The Druze regard the Cave of Elijah as holy, and identify Elijah as "El-Khidr", the green prophet who symbolizes water and life, a miracle who cures the sick.
 
Druze, like some Christians, believe that Elijah came back as John the Baptist, or as Saint George, since they belief in reincarnation and the transmigration of the soul, Druze believe that El Khidr and John the Baptist are one and the same. 

Saint George is described as a prophetic figure in Druze sources; and in some sources he is identified with Elijah or Mar Elias, and in others as al-Khidr. Druze believe that Elijah came back as John the Baptist and as Saint George, and the Druze version of the story of al-khidr was syncretized with the story of Saint George and the Dragon.

Ziyarat al-Nabi al-Khidr is an Israeli Druze festival called Ziyara celebrated in 25 January which is officially recognized in Israel as a public holiday for Druzes, the celebration starts on 24 January and concludes on 25 January, with many religious leaders from all the religions in Israel, and also political leaders (occasionally also the PM), coming to congratulate the Israeli Druze community during their festivities at the Maqam Al-Khidr in Kafr Yasif. Religious leaders or sheikhs from Mount Carmel, the Galilee and the Golan Heights take the opportunity to discuss religious issues.

The Cave of Elijah is a grotto that appears in the Hebrew Bible, where the prophet Elijah took shelter during a journey into the wilderness. The exact location of the cave is unknown. There is a "Cave of Elijah" on Mount Carmel approximately 40 m above sea  level in Haifa. For centuries it has been a pilgrimage destination for Jewish, Christian, Druze, and Muslim people. Another cave associated with Elijah is located nearby, under the altar of the main church of the Stella Maris Monastery, also on Mount Carmel.

Christian 

The Christian New Testament notes that some people thought that Jesus was, in some sense, Elijah, but it also makes clear that John the Baptist is "the Elijah" who was promised to come in Malachi 3:1; 4:5. According to accounts in all three of the Synoptic Gospels, Elijah appeared with Moses during the Transfiguration of Jesus.
In Western Christianity, Elijah is commemorated as a saint with a feast day on 20 July by the Roman Catholic Church and the Lutheran Church–Missouri Synod. Catholics believe that he was unmarried and celibate. In the Eastern Orthodox Church and those Eastern Catholic Churches which follow the Byzantine Rite, he is commemorated on the same date (in the 21st century, Julian Calendar 20 July corresponds to Gregorian Calendar 2 August). He is greatly revered among the Orthodox as a model of the contemplative life. He is also commemorated on the Orthodox liturgical calendar on the Sunday of the Holy Fathers (the Sunday before the Nativity of the Lord).

John the Baptist is also known as John the Forerunner in Christianity, John the Immerser in some Baptist Christian traditions,  He is considered to be a prophet of God by all of these faiths, and is honoured as a saint in many Christian denominations. According to the New Testament, John anticipated a messianic figure greater than himself, and the Gospels portray John as the precursor or forerunner of Jesus, since John announces Jesus' coming and prepares the people for Jesus' ministry. Jesus himself identifies John as "Elijah who is to come", which is a direct reference to the Book of Malachi, that has been confirmed by the angel who announced John's birth to his father, Zechariah. According to the Gospel of Luke, John and Jesus were relatives.

Saint George was a Christian who is venerated as a saint in Christianity, and he was a soldier of Cappadocian Greek origin and member of the Praetorian Guard for Roman emperor Diocletian, who was sentenced to death for refusing to recant his Christian faith. He became one of the most venerated saints and megalomartyrs in Christendom, and he has been especially venerated as a military saint since the Crusades. In hagiography, as one of the Fourteen Holy Helpers and one of the most prominent military saints, he is immortalized in the legend of Saint George and the Dragon. His memorial, Saint George's Day, is traditionally celebrated on 23 April. England, Ethiopia, Georgia, Catalonia and Aragon in Spain, Moscow in Russia, and several other states, regions, cities, universities, professions and organizations claim George as their patron. The bones of Saint George are buried in the Church of Saint George, Lod, Israel.

Religious text

Christian elements in the Epistles of Wisdom 

The Epistles of Wisdom or Rasa'il al-Hikmah is a corpus of sacred texts and pastoral letters by teachers of the Druze Faith, the full Druze canon or Druze scripture includes the Old Testament, the New Testament, the Quran and philosophical works by Plato and those influenced by Socrates among works from other religions and philosophers. Most of the Epistles of Wisdom are written in a post-classical language, often showing similarities to Arab Christian authors. The texts provide formidable insight into the incorporation of the Universal Intellect and the soul of the world in 11th century Egypt, when the deity showed itself to men through Fatimid Caliph al-Hakim and his doctrines. These display a notable form of Arabic Neoplatonism blended with Ismailism and adopted Christian elements of great interest for the philosophy and history of religions.

History

Ma'n dynasty 

Historically the relationship between the Druze and Christians has been characterized by harmony and coexistence, with amicable relations between the two groups prevailing throughout history, with the exception of some periods, including 1860 Mount Lebanon civil war.

According to scholar Pinḥas Artzi of Bar-Ilan University:
"Europeans who visited the area during this period related that the Druze "love the Christians more than the other believers", and that they "hate the Turks, the Muslims and the Arabs [Bedouin] with an intense hatred".

The Ottomans, through the Ma'n dynasty, a great Druze feudal family, and the Shihabs, a Sunni Muslim family that had converted to Christianity. Ma'n dynasty were a family of Druze chiefs of Arab stock based in the rugged Chouf area of southern Mount Lebanon who were politically prominent in the 15th–17th centuries. Deir al-Qamar was the capital and the residence of the Emirate of Mount Lebanon. 

Fakhr-al-Din II (1572–1635) was a Druze prince and a leader of the Mount Lebanon Emirate. For uniting modern Lebanon's constituent parts and communities, especially the Druze and the Maronites, under a single authority for the first time in history, he is generally regarded as the country's founder. Christians prospered and played key roles under his rule, with his main enduring legacy being the symbiotic relationship he set in motion between Maronites and Druze, which proved foundational for the creation of a Lebanese entity. Maronite Abū Nādir al-Khāzin was one of his foremost supporters and served as Fakhr-al-Din's adjutant. Phares notes that "The emirs prospered from the intellectual skills and trading talents of the Maronites, while the Christians gained political protection, autonomy and a local ally against the ever-present threat of direct Ottoman rule.  In mid-1609 Fakhr al-Din gave refuge to Maronite Patriarch Yuhanna Makhlouf upon the latter's flight from northern Mount Lebanon. In a 1610 letter from Pope Paul V to Makhlouf, the Pope entrusted Fakhr al-Din with the protection of the Maronite community. 

Under Fakhr al-Din's overlordship, Maronite, Greek Orthodox, and Greek Catholic Christians began migrating to the Druze Mountain in large numbers; the devastation wrought on the Druze peasantry during the punitive government campaigns of the 16th century had likely caused a deficit of Druze farm labor for the Druze landowners, which was partly filled by the Christian migrants. Christians were settled in Druze villages by the Druze tribal chiefs in the days of Fakhr al-Din to stimulate agricultural production, centered on silk, and the chiefs donated land to the Maronite Church and monastic institutions to further facilitate Christian settlement. Fakhr al-Din made the first such donation in 1609. Although the Druze chiefs owned much of the Chouf lands on which the silk crop was grown, Christians dominated every other aspect of the silk economy there, including production, financing, brokerage to the markets of Sidon and Beirut and its export to Europe. The Emir's religious tolerance endeared him to the Christians living under his rule. According to Duwayhi, Under Emir Fakhr al-Din the Christians could raise their heads high. They built churches, rode horses with saddles, wore turbans of fine muslin and belts with precious inlays, and carried jeweled rifles. Missionaries from Europe came and established themselves in Mount Lebanon. This was because his troops were Christians, and his stewards and attendants Maronites.

In Lebanese nationalist narratives, Fakhr-al-Din II is celebrated as establishing a sort of Druzes–Maronite condominium that is often portrayed as the embryo of Lebanese statehood and national identity. Nationalist narratives by Lebanese Druze and Maronites agree on Fakhr al-Din's "decisive influence and contribution to Lebanon's history", according to the historian Yusri Hazran, though they differ significantly in determining the Emir's motives and the historic significance of his rule. Druze authors describe him as the ideal ruler who strove to achieve strong domestic unity, build a prosperous economy, and politically free Lebanon from Ottoman oppression. Making the case that the Ma'nids worked toward Lebanon's integration into the Arab regional environment, the Druze authors generally de-emphasize his relations with Europe and portray his drive for autonomy as the first forerunning of the Arab nationalist movement. On the other hand, Maronite authors viewed the legacy of Fakhr al-Din as one of isolation from the Arab–Islamic milieu. Fakhr al-Din himself has been adopted by a number of Maronite nationalists as a member of the religious group, citing the refuge he may have taken with the Khazens in Keserwan during his adolescence, or claiming that he had embraced Christianity at his deathbed. According to the historian Christopher Stone, Fakhr al-Din was utilized by the Rahbani brothers in their Lebanese nationalist play, The Days of Fakhr al-Din, as "a perfect historical predecessor for Lebanon's Christian nationalism of the twentieth century".

Shihab dynasty 

The Shihab dynasty  was an Arab family whose members served as the paramount tax farmers and local chiefs of Mount Lebanon from the early 18th to mid-19th century, during Ottoman rule. Their reign began in 1697 after the death of the last Ma'nid chief. The family centralized control over Mount Lebanon, destroying the feudal power of the mostly Druze lords and cultivating the Maronite clergy as an alternative power base of the emirate. During Yusuf Shihab's rule, many members of the Shihab family converted to Christianity and Yusuf also began to rely on the support of the Maronite Christians.

On 3 September 1840, Bashir Shihab III, a distant cousin of the once-powerful Emir Bashir Shihab II, was appointed emir of Mount Lebanon by Ottoman Sultan Abdulmejid I. Geographically, the Mount Lebanon Emirate corresponded with the central part of present-day Lebanon, which historically has had a Christian and Druze majority. In practice, the terms "Lebanon" and "Mount Lebanon" tended to be used interchangeably by historians until the formal establishment of the Mandate. Yusuf Shihab and Bashir Shihab II were the only Maronite rulers of the Emirate of Mount Lebanon. The Shihab family allied with Muhammad Ali of Egypt during his occupation of Syria, but was deposed in 1840 when the Egyptians were driven out by an Ottoman-European alliance, leading soon after to the dissolution of the Shihab emirate. Despite losing territorial control, the family remains influential in modern Lebanon, with some members having reached high political office. 

The "Druze-Christian alliance" during this century was the major factor enabling the Shehab dynasty to maintain power. By the middle years of the eighteenth century, the Shihabi amirs converted to Christianity, so did several Druze amirs and prominent Druze clans, like the originally Druze Abi-Lamma clan (a Druze family who was a close ally of the Shihabs) which also converted to Christianity and joined the Maronite Church. After the Shehab dynasty converted to Christianity, the Druze lost most of their political and feudal powers. Also, the Druze formed an alliance with Britain and allowed Protestant Christian missionaries to enter Mount Lebanon, creating tension between them and the native Maronite Church. Approximately 10,000 Christians were killed by the Druze during inter-communal violence in 1860.
During the nineteenth and twentieth centuries, Protestant missionaries established schools and churches in Druze strongholds, with some Druze converting to Protestant Christianity; yet they did not succeed to convert Druze to Christianity en masse.

1860 civil conflict in Mount Lebanon 

The 1860 civil conflict in Mount Lebanon and Damascus (also called the 1860 Syrian Civil War)  was a civil conflict in Mount Lebanon during Ottoman rule in 1860–1861 fought mainly between the local Druze and Christians. Following decisive Druze victories and massacres against the Christians, the conflict spilled over into other parts of Ottoman Syria, particularly Damascus, where thousands of Christian residents (10,0000) were killed by Muslim and Druze militiamen. The fighting precipitated a French-led international military intervention.

Bitter conflicts between Christians and Druzes, which had been simmering under Ibrahim Pasha's rule (mostly centred on the firmans of 1839 and, more decisively, of 1856, which equalised the status of Muslim and non-Muslim subjects, the former resenting their implied loss of superiority) resurfaced under the new emir (Bashir Shihab III). The sultan deposed Bashir III on 13 January 1842 and appointed Omar Pasha as governor of Mount Lebanon. Representatives of the European powers proposed to the sultan that Mount Lebanon be partitioned into Christian and Druze sections. On 7 December 1842, the sultan adopted the proposal and asked the governor of Damascus to divide the region into two districts: a northern district under a Christian deputy governor and a southern district under a Druze deputy governor. The arrangement came to be known as the "Double Qaimaqamate". Both officials were to be responsible to the governor of Sidon, who resided in Beirut. The Beirut-Damascus highway was the dividing line between the two districts.

While the Ottoman authorities pursued a divide-and-rule strategy, various European powers established alliances with the various religious groups in the region. The French established an alliance with the Lebanese Christians, while the Druze formalized an alliance with the British, allowing them to send Protestant missionaries into the region. The increasing tensions led to an outbreak of conflict between Christians and Druzes as early as May 1845. Consequently, the European great powers requested for the Ottoman sultan to establish order in Lebanon, and he attempted to do so by establishing a new council in each of the districts. Composed of members of the various religious communities, the councils were intended to assist the deputy governor.

Economic and demographic factors also played a role in undermining the peaceful coexistence of the Druze and Christian in this period, the 
Maronite benefited from the advantages of modernising and expanding economy, built with French assistance, disproportionately accrued to them. Lebanese Christian wealth prospered because of connections with Europe. Additionally, the maronite population had over the span of only a few decades dramatically overtaken that of the Druze. Numerically and commercially; Christians posed a threat to the traditional landlords Druze elite. As Lebanese Christians formed the wealthy elite and the educated class, they have had a significant impact on the politics and culture of the Arab World, and they created a growing demand for Western-style education in law, medicine, science, engineering, and finance, and for the greater opportunities for wealth.

Maronite-Druze dualism in Mount Lebanon Mutasarrifate 

After fierce fighting erupted between the Druze and Maronite populations in the Mount Lebanon region in 1860. France and other Western nations then pressured the Ottomans to set up a semiautonomous region known as a Mutasarrifate. After 1861 there existed an autonomous Mount Lebanon with a Christian mutasarrıf, which had been created as a homeland for the Maronites under European diplomatic pressure following the 1860 massacres. The Maronite Catholics and the Druze founded modern Lebanon in the early eighteenth century, through the ruling and social system known as the "Maronite-Druze dualism" which developed in Ottoman-era Mount Lebanon Mutasarrifate, creating one of the calmest atmospheres that Lebanon had ever lived in. The working out of this dualism greatly affected the character of independent Lebanon later. Upon the establishment of the Mutasarrifate system, the Christians and Druze groups entered in economic, political, and religious relations with Europeans rather than Ottomans. Historians link the Maronite ascendancy in the Mutasarrifate to their alliance with the French and their subsequent domination of the silk trade, through the development of a Maronite bourgeoisie class.

In 1870 many Christian foreign schools were opened in Lebanon, which were among the main centers of the renaissance (Nahda) and this led to the establishment of schools, universities, theater and printing presses. The remainder of the 19th century saw a relative period of stability, as Druze and Maronite groups focused on economic and cultural development which saw the founding of the American University of Beirut (Syrian Protestant College) and Saint Joseph University and a flowering of literary and political activity associated with the attempts to liberalize the Ottoman Empire. Late in the century there was a short Druze uprising over the extremely harsh government and high taxation rates, but there was far less of the violence that had scalded the area earlier in the century. The total population in 1895 was estimated as 399,530, with 30,422 (7.8%) Muslims, 49,812 (12.5%) Druze and 319,296 (79.9%) Christians.

Modern history 

The Maronite Catholic and the Druze founded modern Lebanon in the early eighteenth century, through the ruling and social system known as the "Maronite-Druze dualism" in Mount Lebanon Mutasarrifate. Contact between Christians (members of the Maronite, Eastern Orthodox, Melkite, and other churches) and the Unitarian Druze led to the presence of mixed villages and towns in Mount Lebanon, Chouf, Jabal al-Druze, the Galilee region, Mount Carmel, and Golan Heights.  They both speak the Arabic language and follow a social pattern very similar to those of the other peoples of the Levant (Eastern Mediterranean). Scholars consider the Antiochian Greek Christians, Druze, and Maronites as ethnoreligious groups,.

The relationship between the Druze and Christians in Syria, Lebanon and Israel has been characterized by harmony and peaceful coexistence, and they lived in the Chuf Mountains in the past in complete harmony. Druze and Christians in Syria, Lebanon and Israel celebrate each other's births, weddings, funerals, and celebrations such as Christmas, Maundy Thursday (in Lebanon), Easter and the Christian festival of Saint Elias (in Mount Carmel).

Before 2011, more than 55,000 Christians lived in As-Suwayda Governorate, the only governorate in Syria that has a Druze majority. In 2010, more than 52,000 registered Christian voters (mostly Maronites) lived in Aley District, where Druze form a majority. In 2010 more than 8,000 Christians (mostly Melkite, Greek Orthodox members of the Greek Orthodox Church of Jerusalem, and Maronites) lived in Druze-majority towns and cities in Israel.

Druze constitute one third of the residents of Rachaya District, and more than a quarter of the residents of Chouf District (Chouf is the heartland of the Lebanese Druze community) and the Matn District, and a significant minority in Marjeyoun District. While Christians constitute about 40% of the residents of Chouf District, and about a quarter of residents of Rashaya District, and a majority in Matn District and Marjeyoun District. Baabda District and Hasbaya District has mostly had a Christian and Druze population.

In 2021 the largest Druze communities outside the Middle East are in Venezuela (60,000) and in the United States (50,000); both are predominantly Christian countries. Members of the Druze faith in the United States face the difficulty of finding a Druze partner and practicing endogamy; marriage outside the Druze faith is strongly discouraged according to the Druze doctrine. They also face the pressure of keeping the religion alive because many Druze immigrants to the United States converted to Protestantism, becoming communicants of the Presbyterian or Methodist churches. The early Druze migrants to Venezuela tended to mix well with the local population, and some Druze converted to Catholicism. On the other hand, most of them maintained their strong identity through Druze Arab identity and Druze values. A former vice president Tareck El Aissami is Druze, showing the small group's influence in this predominantly Catholic country.

In Syria 

In Syria, most Druze live in the As-Suwayda Governorate, the only governorate in Syria that has a Druze majority. In the 1980s Druze made up 87.6% of the population, Christians (mostly Greek Orthodox) 11% and Sunni Muslims 2%. In 2010, the As-Suwayda governorate has a population of about 375,000 inhabitants, Druze made up 90%, Christians 7% and Sunni Muslims 3%. Due to low birth and high emigration rates, Christians proportion in As-Suwayda had declined.

The Druze form a majority in the Jabal Hauran, which is part of the al-Suwayda Governorate. There is a significant Christian population, both Greek Orthodox and Greek Catholic (Melkite), in the Hauran region as a whole, though most Christians are concentrated in the towns and villages straddling the western foothills of Jabal Hauran. Most of the Christians of Jabal Hauran are descents of the Ghassanids (Arab tribe). According to the historian Kamal al-Shofani "Christians inhabited the region before the Druze, and some of them came to Jabal al-Druze (Mountain of the Druze) at the end of the 17th century, fleeing Ottoman oppression". 

The relationship between the Druze and Christians in As-Suwayda Governorate has been characterized by harmony and peaceful coexistence, and more than 55,000 Christians (mostly Greek Orthodox members of the Greek Orthodox Church of Antioch, Melkite, and Latin Catholic) lived in As-Suwayda Governorate before 2011, and they have several ancient churches. Outside As-Suwayda Governorate Christians and Druze lives and share some mixed villages and towns such as Jaramana, Sahnaya and Jdeidat Artouz.

In Lebanon 

Lebanese Christians and Druze became a genetic isolate in the predominantly Islamic world. Contact between Christians (members of the Maronite, Eastern Orthodox, Melkite, and other churches) and the Unitarian Druze led to the presence of mixed villages and towns in Mount Lebanon (Aley District, Baabda District, and Chouf District), Rashaya District, Hasbaya, Matn District, and Marjeyoun District.

The Druzite and Maronite community in Lebanon played an important role in the formation of the modern state of Lebanon. The relationship between the Druze and Christians in Lebanon has been characterized by harmony and coexistence, and they lived in the Shuf Mountains in the past in complete harmony.  Druze and Christians in Lebanon celebrate each other's births, weddings, funerals, and celebrations such as Christmas, Maundy Thursday and Easter, especially before and after the Lebanese Civil War. Thursday of the Dead is a feast day shared by Christians and Druze in the Lebanon. It falls sometime between the Easter Sundays of the Catholic and Eastern Orthodox Christian traditions. It is a day on which the souls of the dead are honoured. A popular day among women in the region, it underscores the shared culture between Arab Christians and Druze in Lebanon.

Historically Druzes, by large, sent their children to Protestant schools and accepted an implicit orientation toward Britain. At the Catholic schools and universities (such as Notre Dame University–Louaize) in Lebanon, Christian and Druze students study and socialise together. Marriage outside the Druze faith is rare and is strongly discouraged, and Druze can face serious social consequences if he or she converts to another faith to marry a non-Druze. According to Simon Haddad of Notre Dame University–Louaize "if a Druze marries a Christian or Muslim, they could both be ostracized and marginalized by their community, and this could have very serious consequences if the couple works in town". While according to United Nations High Commissioner for Refugees report: "Conversely, a source contacted by the Research Directorate of Canada’s Immigration and Refugee Board in September 1998 advised that "there would be no problem for a mixed Druze/Orthodox Christian couple to live a normal life in Lebanon today"".

Before and during the Lebanese Civil War (1975–90), the Druze were in favor of Pan-Arabism and Palestinian resistance represented by the PLO. Many of the community supported the Progressive Socialist Party formed by their leader Kamal Jumblatt and they fought alongside other leftist and Palestinian parties against the Lebanese Front that was mainly constituted of Christians. In August 2001, Maronite Catholic Patriarch Nasrallah Boutros Sfeir toured the predominantly Druze Chouf region of Mount Lebanon and visited Mukhtara, the ancestral stronghold of Druze leader Walid Jumblatt. The tumultuous reception that Sfeir received not only signified a historic reconciliation between Maronites and Druze, who fought a war in 1983–1984, but underscored the fact that the banner of Lebanese sovereignty had broad multi-confessional appeal and was a cornerstone for the Cedar Revolution in 2005.

In Israel 

The relationship between the Druze and Christians in Israel has been characterized by harmony and peaceful coexistence, and they lives in peace and friendship together. With the exception of rare clashes, including acts of violence by the Druze against Christians in 2005 in the town of Maghar. Druze and Christians in Israel celebrate each other's births, weddings, funerals, and celebrations such as the Christian festival of Mar Ilyas (Saint Elias) in Haifa.

Contact between Christians (members of the Maronite, Eastern Orthodox, Melkite, and other churches) and the Unitarian Druze led to the presence of mixed villages and towns in Galilee region, Mount Carmel, and the Israeli-occupied portion of the Golan Heights. This includes Abu Snan, Daliyat al-Karmel, Ein Qiniyye, Hurfeish, Isfiya, Kafr Yasif, Kisra-Sumei, Majdal Shams, Maghar, Peki'in, Rameh and Shefa-Amr, where more than 82,000 Druze and 30,000 Christians live together in this mixed villages and towns. Before Israel's occupation, Christians accounted for 12% of the population of the Golan Heights, and they tend to have a high presentation in science and in the white collar professions. But a few Christians remain of a much larger community that left the area. In 2010 more than 8,000 Christians lived in Druze-majority towns and cities in Israel. While in 2016, more than 2,700 Druze lived in Rameh and Kafr Yasif; a Christian-majority towns located in Galilee region, and more than 12,000 Christians and 9,800 Druze lived Abu Snan and Shefa-Amr which form a Muslim majority.

With the exception of rare clashes, including in 2005 Druze attacked Christians in Maghar after rumors spread that some Christian youths created photo images of Druze girls as nude models and posted them on the internet. Christian shops, vehicle, house and the church were vandalized. The clashes forced around 2,000 of the Christians to flee their homes. According to the police investigation, it turns out that a Druze youth had spread lie to his friends about the pictures. Dan Ronen the commander of Northern District commander called the violence "a pogrom".

According to Jack Khoury the clash in Maghar may be a result of animosity between the wealthier Christian population and the poorer Druze. Since in terms of their socio-economic situation, Arab Christians in Israel have high socio-economic situation and are more similar to the Jewish population than to the Muslim Arab or Druze population. And Arab Christians are one of the most educated groups in Israel. Statistically, Arab Christians in Israel have the highest rates of educational attainment among all religious communities.

Many Druze and Muslims attend Christian schools in Israel, because Christian schools are high-performing and among the best schools in the country, and while those schools represent only 4% of the Arab schooling sector, about 34% of Arab university students come from Christian schools, and about 87% of the Israeli Arabs in the high tech sector have been educated in Christian schools.

Religious conversion

Conversion to Christianity from Druze faith 

Conversion of Druze to Christianity used to be common practice in the Levant region. Over the centuries, a number of the Druze embraced Christianity, such as some of Shihab dynasty members, as well as the Abi-Lamma clan. During the nineteenth and twentieth centuries, Protestant missionaries established schools and churches in Druze strongholds, with some Druze converting to Protestant Christianity; yet they did not succeed to convert Druze to Christianity en masse. On the other hand, many Druze immigrants to the United States converted to Protestantism, becoming communicants of the Presbyterian or Methodist Churches. According to the Druze religious courts, between 1952 and 2009, around 10% of Israeli Druze who left the Druze faith converted to Christianity.

By one estimate made by Elisabe Granli from University of Oslo, around 1,920 Syrian Druze converted to Christianity; according to the same study, Christians with a Druze background (Druze converts to Christianity) still regard themselves as Druze, and claim that there is no contradiction between being Druze and being Christian.

Converts to Christianity from Druze faith includes: Mohamed Alí Seineldín, Nada Nadim Prouty, Selwa Roosevelt, and others.

Conversion to Druze faith 
The Druze do not accept converts to their faith. In 1043, Baha al-Din al-Muqtana; one of the main leaders of the Druze religion, declared that the sect would no longer accept new adherents, and since that time, proselytism has been prohibited. Marriage outside the Druze faith is forbidden and is strongly discouraged, and if a Druze marries a non-Druze, the Druze could be ostracized and marginalized by their community. Because a non-Druze partner cannot convert to Druze faith, a couple consisting of a Druze and non-Druze partner cannot have Druze children; the religion can only be passed onto a child born to two Druze parents.

Gallery

See also

 Christianity and other religions
 Christianity and Islam

Notes

References

Sources

Further reading 
 R. J. Mouawad, Les Maronites. Chrétiens du Liban, Brepols Publishers, Turnhout, 2009, 
 Dr. Anis Obeid: The Druze & Their Faith in Tawhid, Syracuse University Press (July 2006). .
 
 Samy Swayd The Druzes: An Annotated Bibliography, Kirkland, Washington: ISES Publications (1998). .
 
 

 

Christianity and Islam
Christianity and other religions
Druze and other religions